The 2015–16 Oregon Ducks men's basketball team represented the University of Oregon during the 2015–16 NCAA Division I men's basketball season. The Ducks were led by sixth year head coach Dana Altman. They played their home games at Matthew Knight Arena and were members of the Pac–12 Conference. They finished the season 31–7, 14–4 in Pac-12 play to win the Pac-12 regular season championship. They defeated Washington, Arizona and Utah to be champions of the Pac-12 tournament. They received the conference's automatic bid to the NCAA tournament where they defeated Holy Cross, Saint Joseph's, and Duke to advance to the Elite Eight where they lost to Oklahoma.

Previous season
The 2014–15 Oregon Ducks finished the season with an overall record of 26–10, and 13–5 in the Pac-12. In the Pac–12 Tournament, the Ducks made it to the Championship game where they lost to Arizona, 52–80. They received an at-large bid in the NCAA tournament as an 8-seed in the West Region. They defeated Oklahoma State in the second round before losing to Wisconsin in the round of 32.

Off-season

Departures

Incoming transfers

2015 recruiting class

Roster

Roster notes
 January 5, 2016 – Freshman Trevor Manuel asked for release and will transfer.
 January 6, 2016 – Redshirt Senior Dylan Ennis to miss rest of the season due to a foot injury.
 March 16, 2016 – Oregon announced that the NCAA had awarded senior Chris Boucher an extra year of eligibility. In the Quebec educational system, students complete high school a year earlier than in the rest of North America, and normally attend a pre-university school known as a CEGEP. After Boucher's final year of high school in 2010–11, he did not academically qualify for CEGEP, and was out of school in 2011–12 before attending a prep school in Alma, Quebec for 2012–13 and playing 13 games in that season (considerably fewer that a typical U.S. prep school schedule). The NCAA initially treated the end of his final year of high school as his graduation date and his prep school year as his first year of college competition. Oregon applied for a waiver from the NCAA, citing serious family hardship during Boucher's high school years, the abbreviated nature of his prep school basketball season, and his satisfactory academic progress at Oregon.

Schedule

|-
!colspan=6 style="background:#004F27; color:yellow;"| Exhibition

|-
!colspan=6 style="background:#004F27; color:yellow;"| Non-conference regular season

|-
!colspan=6 style="background:#004F27; color:yellow;"| Pac-12 regular season

|-
!colspan=6 style="background:#004F27; color:yellow;"| Pac-12 tournament

|-
!colspan=6 style="background:#004F27; color:yellow;"| NCAA tournament

Ranking movement

References

Oregon Ducks men's basketball seasons
Oregon
2015 in sports in Oregon
Oregon Ducks men's basketball
Oregon
Pac-12 Conference men's basketball tournament championship seasons